Islamic Development Coordination Council is one of the revolutionary institutions of the Islamic Republic of Iran, which coordinates and coheres for the development activities between the "development-agencies/centers". This council was formed on 3 August 1980 with the consent of Iran's Supreme Leader, Seyyed Ruhollah Khomeini.

The head of this institution who is appointed by the Supreme Leader, has been managed by two chiefs till now; i.e. "Gholam-Hossein Haqqani" was its first head since the start until 1982; afterwards Ahmad Jannati has been appointed as the new head of the organization, and is still active so far. The main center of the organization is located in the capital of Iran, Tehran. Its other centers are in the capitals of all Iran's provinces; plus it has also centers in other cities.

Activities 
"Islamic Development Coordination Council coordinates/coheres the development activities between the "development-agencies/centers". The fields of activities of the council are related to "holding (significant) ceremonies and occasions", among: 
 Iranian Islamic Republic Day
 Death and state funeral of Ruhollah Khomeini
 15 Khordad incident
 Hafte Tir
 Hashte Shahrivar
 17 Shahrivar
 Quds Day
 Eid al-Fitr
 Mid-Sha'ban
 9 Dey
 Fajr decade
 13 Aban
 Hafte-ye-Zan (Woman's day)
And so forth.

See also 
 Coordination Council of Islamic Revolution Forces
 Islamic Development Organization
 Islamic Culture and Communication Organization

References

Organisations under control of the Supreme Leader of Iran
Organizations established in 1980
Islamic organisations based in Iran
Organisations based in Tehran
Revolutionary institutions of the Islamic Republic of Iran